Vivi and... is an album by Taiwanese singer/actress/model Vivian Hsu, released September 19, 2006 on the Avex label. This album includes the hit single 美人魚 written by Jay Chou.

Catalog number: AVCCD90085/AVTCD95920

Track listing
 SOSO – 3:39
 美人魚 - 3:52
 親愛的 - 5:03
 女人心機 - 3:21
 I Still Believe - 4:47
 小女子 - 3:32
 來電Darling - 2:53
 別愛我 - 4:27
 臭皮匠V.S.諸葛亮 - 3:49
 因為你 – 4:20

Vivian Hsu albums
2006 albums